Cirsium dissectum, also known as meadow thistle, is an erect perennial herb.  It is found in England, Wales, Ireland, France, the Netherlands, Germany, Italy, Spain, Hungary, Norway, etc. It is found in fens and less acidic peat bogs i.e. it prefers damp boggy areas.

Description

Cirsium dissectum grows 15 to 50 cm tall.  It resembles a more slender version of Cirsium heterophyllum in having a grooved cottony stem and lanceolate shaped leaves, that have prickles and not spines.  However the leaves are narrower (under 3 cm), less hairy underneath, and hairy on top.

The flower heads are 2 to 3 cm long, the florets being dark red/purple, flowering from June until August.

The plant has runners.

Similar species

Cirsium tuberosum or tuberous thistle, has tuberous roots rather than runners, and the leaves are twice pinnated.  It is found in Calcareous grasslands but very rare.  It has been recorded in Britain in the counties of Cambridgeshire, Glamorgan, and Wiltshire.

It flowers from June until July.

References

dissectum
Flora of Europe
Plants described in 1753
Taxa named by Carl Linnaeus